Bellechasse Regional County Municipality is a regional county municipality in the Chaudière-Appalaches region of Quebec. The county seat is Saint-Lazare-de-Bellechasse.

Saint-Lazare was chosen as the county seat because of its central location. Other municipalities, such as Saint-Anselme, Sainte-Claire, and Saint-Damien had wanted to be the county seat because of their larger population. The region belongs to the Lévis—Bellechasse federal electoral district.

Subdivisions
There are 20 subdivisions within the RCM:

Municipalities (13)
 Armagh
 Beaumont
 Honfleur
 Saint-Anselme
 Saint-Charles-de-Bellechasse
 Saint-Gervais
 Saint-Henri
 Saint-Lazare-de-Bellechasse
 Saint-Michel-de-Bellechasse
 Saint-Nérée-de-Bellechasse
 Saint-Raphaël
 Saint-Vallier
 Sainte-Claire

Parishes (7)
 La Durantaye
 Notre-Dame-Auxiliatrice-de-Buckland
 Saint-Damien-de-Buckland
 Saint-Léon-de-Standon
 Saint-Malachie
 Saint-Nazaire-de-Dorchester
 Saint-Philémon

Demographics
(Statistics Canada, 2016)
 Population: 37,233
 Population change (2011-2016): +5.4
 Dwellings: 17,740
 Area (km²): 1,751.06
 Population Density (per km².): 21.3

Transportation

Access Routes
Highways and numbered routes that run through the municipality, including external routes that start or finish at the county border:

 Autoroutes
 

 Principal Highways
 
 

 Secondary Highways
 
 
 
 
 
 
 

 External Routes
 None

Attractions
 Beaumont Mill, 1821 (Beaumont)
 Ferme Appalaches Safari Ranch (Saint-Lazare)
 Gold Museum (Saint-Philémon)
 Horse-drawn carriages Museum (Saint-Vallier)
 Le Ricaneux Artisanal Wine (Saint-Charles)
 Massif du Sud Ski Area (Saint-Philémon)
 Notre-Dame-de-Perpetual-Secours Historical Centre (Saint-Damien-de-Buckland)

Protected Areas
 Massif du Sud Regional Park
 St-Vallier National Migratory Bird Sanctuary

See also
 List of regional county municipalities and equivalent territories in Quebec
 Sisters of Our Lady of Perpetual Help, Bellechasse

References

Regional county municipalities in Chaudière-Appalaches
Census divisions of Quebec